The 1994–95 Divizia B was the 55th season of the second tier of the Romanian football league system.

The format has been maintained to two series, each of them having 18 teams. At the end of the season, the winners of the series promoted to Divizia A and the last two places from both series relegated to Divizia C. The teams which were ranked 2nd played a promotion/relegation play-off against teams ranked 15th and 16th in the Divizia A and teams ranked 15th and 16th in the Divizia B in both series, played a relegation/promotion play-off against the 2nd places from Divizia C.

Team changes

To Divizia B
Promoted from Divizia C
 Cetatea Târgu Neamț
 Poiana Câmpina
 Dacia Pitești
 Unirea Dej

Relegated from Divizia A
 Politehnica Timișoara
 Dacia Unirea Brăila

From Divizia B
Relegated to Divizia C
 Foresta Fălticeni
 Metalul Bocșa
 Constructorul Iași
 Drobeta-Turnu Severin

Promoted to Divizia A
 Argeș Pitești
 Maramureș Baia Mare

Renamed teams
Gloria CFR Galați was renamed as Constant Galați.

Chimia Râmnicu Vâlcea was renamed as FC Râmnicu Vâlcea.

League tables

Serie I

Serie II

Promotion play-off
The 15th and 16th-placed teams of the Divizia A faced the 3rd and 2nd-placed teams of the Divizia B. The matches were played on neutral ground, the first one on the Municipal Stadium in Sfântu Gheorghe and the second one on the Tineretului Stadium in Brașov.

|}

Relegation play-off
The 15th and 16th-placed teams of the Divizia B faced the 2nd-placed teams of the Divizia C. The matches were played on neutral ground, the first one on the Municipal Stadium in Buzău, the second one on the Astra Stadium in Ploiești, the third one on the Electro-Precizia Stadium in Săcele and the last one on the Gloria Stadium in Bistrița.

|}

Top scorers 
18 goals
  Narcis Răducan (Selena Bacău)

14 goals
  Vasile Jercălău (Selena Bacău)
  Marcel Băban (Politehnica Timișoara)

12 goals
  Mugur Gușatu (Politehnica Timișoara)

10 goals
  Daniel Baston (Constant Galați)
  Lavi Hrib (Rocar București)
  Romulus Gabor (Corvinul Hunedoara)
  Iulian Florescu (Jiul IELIF Craiova)

9 goals
  Cristian Coroian (CFR Cluj)
  Marius Păcurar (Corvinul Hunedoara)

See also

1994–95 Divizia A

References

Liga II seasons
Rom
2